Chinese Restaurant is a Chinese celebrity reality show broadcast by Hunan Television. The show features five celebrities as they run a chinese restaurant abroad in 20 days with the aim to promote Chinese Food culture. It's Vicky Zhao's first reality show as a regular guest.

The first season was taped in Thailand, and it was premiered on 22 July 2017 with 11 episodes. The second season was taped in France, and it was premiered on 20 July 2018 with 12 episodes. The third season was taped in Italy, and it was premiered on 26 July 2019 with 13 episodes. The fourth season was taped in China due to the ongoing COVID-19 pandemic, and it was premiered on 31 July 2020 with 12 episodes. The fifth season was taped in China again, and it was premiered on 30 July 2021 with 12 episodes. The sixth season was taped in China the third time, and it was premiered on 12 August 2022 with 12 episodes.

Cast

Season 1 
 Vicky Zhao
 Huang Xiaoming
 Zhou Dongyu
 Sean Zhang
 Enti Jin

Season 2 
 Vicky Zhao
 Shu Qi
 Alec Su
 Karry Wang
 Pax Congo

Season 3 
 Regular
 Huang Xiaoming
 Qin Hailu
 Karry Wang (left in Episode 8 due to school work)
 Yang Zi
 Jack Lin

 Recurring
 Tong Zhuo (start from Episode 3)

Season 4 
 Huang Xiaoming
 Zanilia Zhao
 Sean Zhang
 Jack Lin
 Ariel Li

Season 5 
 Regular
 Huang Xiaoming
 Ning Jing
 Zhou Ye
 Tenzin Tsundue
 Annabel Yao

 Recurring
 Gong Jun (Changsha)
 Tan Jianci (Guilin)

Season 6 
 Huang Xiaoming
 Yin Tao
 Yin Zheng
 Chen Linong
 Zhang Ruonan

List of guests

Season 1 
 Cui Xinqin (Episode 4)
 Mike D. Angelo (Episode 5)
 Hongyok Chansakorn (Episode 5)
 Boat Sirirod (Episode 5)

Season 2 
 Zhang Tielin (Episode 4 – 5)
 Bao Bei'er (Episode 8 – 9)
 Yang Zishan (Episode 8 – 9)
 Huang Xiaoming (Episode 9 – 10)

Season 3 
 Neil Gao (Episode 3 – 5)
 Shen Mengchen (Episode 6 – 7)
 Du Haitao (Episode 6 – 7)
 Dylan Wang (Episode 9 – 11)
 Alec Su (Episode 11 – 13)

Season 4 
 Nemo Feng (Episode 4 – 6, 9 – 12)
 Casper Chu (Episode 4 – 6, 9 – 12)
 Liu Yuning (Episode 6 – 12)
 Yang Chaoyue (Episode 8 – 12)
 Du Haitao (Episode 9 – 12)
 Karry Wang (Episode 9 – 12)
 Li Zifeng (Episode 9 – 12)
 Cai Cheng (Episode 9 – 12)
 Joy Wang (Episode 9 – 12)

Season 6 
 Will Liu (Episode 4 – 6)
 Vivi Wang (Episode 4 – 6)
 Huang Xiaolei (Episode 6 – 7)
 Hu Lianxin (Episode 6 – 7)
 Wu Xingjian (Episode 6 – 7)
 Na Ying (Episode 9 – 10)
 Cai Guoqing (Episode 11)
 Wowkie Zhang (Episode 11)

Theme Song 
 "Chinese Restaurant" (Season 1 – 3)
 Composer: Tu Yi
 Lyricist:
 Meng Xiao (Season 1 & 2)
 Meng Xiao and Ye Feng (Season 3)
Performer: 
 Vicky Zhao and Huang Xiaoming (Season 1)
 Zhou Dongyu (Special Edition of Season 1)
 Vicky Zhao and Alec Su (Season 2)
 Huang Xiaoming, Qin Hailu, Yang Zi and Karry Wang (Season 3)
 "Chinese Flavor" (Season 4)
 Composer: Casper Chu, Gen Neo
 Lyricist: Casper Chu, Zhang Jinghao
Performer:
 Huang Xiaoming, Zanilia Zhao, Sean Zhang, Jack Lin, Ariel Li, Liu Yuning and Casper Chu
 Liu Yuning and Casper Chu
 Casper Chu
 "The Flavor of China" (Season 5)
 Composer: Mo Yanlin
 Lyricist: Xia Nuo
 Performer: Huang Xiaoming and Ning Jing

International broadcast

Reception

Ratings 
 Season 1

|-
| 1
| 
| 1.369
| 7.31
| 3
| 1.36
| 8.7
| 1
| 1.52
| 9.04
| 1
|-
| 2
| 
| 1.486
| 8.34
| 2
| 
| 
| 1
| 
| 
| 1
|-
| 3
| 
| 1.351
| 7.50
| 1
| 1.34
| 8.73
| 1
| 1.6
| 9.48
| 1
|-
| 4
| 
| 1.353
| 7.68
| 1
| 1.21
| 8.18
| 1
| 1.45
| 9.07
| 1
|-
| 5
| 
| 
| 
| 1
| 1.38
| 9.39
| 1
| 1.55
| 9.64
| 1
|-
| 6
| 
| 1.531
| 8.64
| 2
| 1.1
| 7.43
| 1
| 1.32
| 8.16
| 1
|-
| 7
| 
| 1.129
| 6.70
| 3
| 
| 7.07
| 1
| 1.2
| 7.86
| 1
|-
| 8
| 
| 1.193
| 6.94
| 1
| 1.06
| 7.62
| 1
| —
| —
| —
|-
| 9
| 
| 
| 
| 4
| 1.09
| 7.87
| 1
| 1.25
| 8.05
| 1
|-
| 10
| 
| 1.049
| 6.30
| 6
| 0.98
| 
| 1
| 
| 
| 1
|-
| 11
| 
| 1.085
| 6.74
| 2
| 1.08
| 7.81
| 1
| 1.27
| 8.21
| 1

 Season 2

|-
| 1
| 
| 
| 
| 1
| 
| 
| 1
| 1.43
| 10.8
| 1
|-
| 2
| 
| 0.884
| 6.19
| 3
| 1.09
| 8.69
| 1
| —
| —
| —
|-
| 3
| 
| 0.748
| 5.36
| 4
| 0.83
| 6.72
| 2
| —
| —
| —
|-
| 4
| 
| 0.817
| 5.83
| 3
| 0.99
| 7.83
| 1
| —
| —
| —
|-
| 5
| 
| 0.693
| 4.79
| 5
| 0.78
| 6.44
| 2
| —
| —
| —
|-
| 6
| 
| 0.628
| 4.51
| 3
| 0.74
| 6.19
| 2
| —
| —
| —
|-
| 7
| 
| 0.615
| 4.39
| 3
| 0.68
| 5.5
| 2
| —
| —
| —
|-
| 8
| 
| 0.615
| 4.34
| 3
| 0.64
| 5.63
| 2
| —
| —
| —
|-
| 9
| 
| 0.673
| 4.78
| 4
| 0.6
| 4.95
| 2
| —
| —
| —
|-
| 10
| 
| 0.631
| 4.36
| 4
| 0.56
| 4.79
| 2
| —
| —
| —
|-
| 11
| 
| 
| 4.03
| 6
| 0.45
| 4.47
| 2
| —
| —
| —
|-
| 12
| 
| 0.553
| 
| 4
| 
| 
| 1
| —
| —
| —

 Season 3

|-
| 1
| 
| 
| 
| 4
| 
| 
| 2
| 0.97
| 7.94
| 2
|-
| 2
| 
| 0.628
| 5.06
| 3
| 0.61
| 5.76
| 2
| —
| —
| —
|-
| 3
| 
| 0.685
| 5.63
| 3
| 0.64
| 6.68
| 2
| —
| —
| —
|-
| 4
| 
| 0.708
| 5.94
| 4
| 0.57
| 5.99
| 2
| 0.75
| 6.87
| 2
|-
| 5
| 
| 0.703
| 5.89
| 4
| 0.56
| 5.7
| 2
| —
| —
| —
|-
| 6
| 
| 0.641
| 5.98
| 3
| 0.53
| 6.36
| 2
| —
| —
| —
|-
| 7
| 
| 0.655
| 5.55
| 5
| 0.55
| 6.19
| 2
| —
| —
| —
|-
| 8
| 
| 0.609
| 4.47
| 8
| 0.45
| 4.49
| 2
| —
| —
| —
|-
| 9
| 
| 0.573
| 4.94
| 4
| 0.35
| 4.29
| 2
| —
| —
| —
|-
| 10
| 
| 0.544
| 4.84
| 5
| —
| —
| —
| —
| —
| —
|-
| 11
| 
| 0.552
| 4.72
| 6
| 0.42
| 4.74
| 2
| —
| —
| —
|-
| 12
| 
| 0.490
| 4.16
| 4
| 
| 3.49
| 1
| —
| —
| —
|-
| 13
| 
| 
| 
| 8
| 0.27
| 
| 1
| —
| —
| —

 Season 4

|-
| 1
| 
| 1.027
| 5.97
| 9
| 0.65
| 
| 2
| —
| —
| —
|-
| 2
| 
| 
| 14.43
| 4
| —
| —
| —
| —
| —
| —
|-
| 3
| 
| 1.911
| 13.45
| 4
| —
| —
| —
| —
| —
| —
|-
| 4
| 
| 2.030
| 15.84
| 3
| 
| 
| 2
| 
| 
| 2
|-
| 5
| 
| 1.789
| 13.59
| 3
| 0.67
| 7.40
| 2
| 0.93
| 8.69
| 2
|-
| 6
| 
| 1.507
| 11.97
| 3
| —
| —
| —
| —
| —
| —
|-
| 7
| 
| 0.983
| 10.02
| 2
| —
| —
| —
| —
| —
| —
|-
| 8
| 
| 1.693
| 
| 3
| —
| —
| —
| 
| —
| 2
|-
| 9
| 
| 1.516
| 12.35
| 4
| 
| 7.37
| 2
| 0.84
| 
| 2
|-
| 10
| 
| 1.363
| 10.83
| 3
| 0.64
| 7.19
| 2
| —
| —
| —
|-
| 11
| 
| 
| 
| 7
| —
| —
| —
| —
| —
| —
|-
| 12
| 
| 1.493
| 11.09
| 3
| 0.68
| 7.39
| 2
| 1.02
| 9.43
| 2

 Season 5

|-
| 1
| 
| 1.879
| 14.83
| 2
| 0.72
| 7.77
| 1
| 1.06
| 9.9
| 1
|-
| 2
| 
| 
| 15.15
| 2
| 
| 8.79
| 1
| 
| 10.74
| 1
|-
| 3
| 
| 1.789
| 13.70
| 3
| 0.74
| 7.7
| 1
| 1.08
| 9.81
| 1
|-
| 4
| 
| 1.838
| 14.44
| 2
| 0.65
| 7.31
| 1
| 
| 
| 1
|-
| 5
| 
| 1.884
| 14.44
| 1
| 0.75
| 8.27
| 1
| 1.05
| 9.95
| 1
|-
| 6
| 
| 1.797
| 13.85
| 2
| 0.68
| 7.77
| 1
| 0.99
| 9.8
| 1
|-
| 7
| 
| 1.813
| 15.65
| 1
| 0.68
| 8.58
| 1
| 1.0
| 10.67
| 1
|-
| 8
| 
| 1.720
| 
| 3
| 0.56
| 
| 1
| 0.84
| 
| 1
|-
| 9
| 
| 1.832
| 14.53
| 2
| 0.61
| 6.89
| 1
| —
| —
| —
|-
| 10
| 
| 
| 
| 3
| 0.5
| 
| 2
| —
| —
| —
|-
| 11
| 
| 1.318
| 13.41
| 3
| 
| 6.27
| 2
| —
| —
| —
|-
| 12
| 
| —
| —
| —
| —
| —
| —
| —
| —
| —

 Season 6

|-
| 1
| 
| 1.376
| 11.60
| 5
| 1.52
| 4.93
| 1
|-
| 2
| 
| 1.643
| 13.50
| 5
| 1.54
| 4.94
| 1
|-
| 3
| 
| 1.568
| 12.39
| 5
| 1.48
| 4.68
| 1
|-
| 4
| 
| 2.044
| 
| 3
| 1.28
| 3.78
| 2
|-
| 5
| 
| 
| 
| 6
| 1.47
| 4.41
| 2
|-
| 6
| 
| 1.769
| 15.82
| 2
| 1.54
| 4.75
| 2
|-
| 7
| 
| 1.828
| 17.01
| 2
| 
| 
| 2
|-
| 8
| 
| 
| 16.85
| 3
| 1.52
| 4.4
| 2
|-
| 9
| 
| 1.634
| 13.68
| 4
| 
| 
| 2
|-
| 10
| 
| 1.944
| 16.40
| 2
| 1.26
| 3.9
| 1
|-
| 11
| 
| 1.981
| 16.42
| 2
| 1.26
| 3.9
| 2
|-
| 12
| 
| —
| —
| —
| 1.30
| 4.1
| 2

Awards and nominations

Influences 
After premiering of the first season on 22 July 2017, the canned bacon labeled "SPAM" was sold out in Chinese online shopping in several hours, which Vicky Zhao bought in a Thailand supermarket and cooking in the show. After premiering of the second season on 20 July 2018, the white stork toy was sold out in Chinese online shopping in several days, which repeated Vicky Zhao's words in the show.

Controversy 
Chinese Restaurant has been accused of plagiarism in regards to its format being very similar to South Korean reality show tvN's Youn's Kitchen. Both shows are food-themed and work with the concept of overseas restaurants. Na Young-seok, producer of Youn's Kitchen responded to the claim, stating that "The [Youn's Kitchen] format is not expensive to purchase. If they purchase the format, I can help them on specific details as well."

References

External links 

Chinese Restaurant (season 1) on Mango TV 
Chinese Restaurant (season 2) on Mango TV 
Chinese Restaurant (season 3) on Mango TV 
Chinese Restaurant (season 4) on Mango TV 
Chinese Restaurant (season 6) on Mango TV 
 
 
 
 
 Chinese Restaurant (season 2) on TVB.com 
 
 
 
 
 
 

Hunan Television original programming
Chinese reality television series
2017 Chinese television series debuts
Television shows involved in plagiarism controversies